Tersky District is the name of several administrative and municipal districts in Russia:
Tersky District, Kabardino-Balkarian Republic, an administrative and municipal district of the Kabardino-Balkarian Republic
Tersky District, Murmansk Oblast, an administrative and municipal district of Murmansk Oblast

See also
Tersky (disambiguation)

References